Charles R. Huggins (born January 27, 1947) is an American politician who was a Republican member of the Alaska Senate, representing District D. He was President of the Alaska Senate during the 28th Alaska Legislature, leading a caucus of 13 Republicans and 2 Democrats.

Huggins was appointed in 2004 to the Alaska Senate by Governor Frank Murkowski to represent District H. He represented District E following redistricting in 2012.

He filed as a candidate for governor in September 2017. On January 18, 2018, Huggins announced he would drop out of the race for governor.

References

External links
 Alaska State Legislature - Senator Charlie Huggins official government website
 Alaska Senate Majority - Senator Charlie Huggins official caucus website
 Project Vote Smart - Senator Charlie Huggins (AK) profile
 Follow the Money - Charlie Huggins
 2006 Senate campaign contributions
 Charlie Huggins at 100 Years of Alaska's Legislature

1947 births
Living people
21st-century American politicians
Baptists from Florida
Florida State University alumni
People from High Springs, Florida
People from Wasilla, Alaska
Presidents of the Alaska Senate
Republican Party Alaska state senators
Titusville High School alumni
United States Army officers
Webster University alumni